Herencia Norteña is the ninth studio album by La Mafia, released on October 19, 1985. it entered the latin billboard regional charts at number 12 and by November 1985 it reached peak position number 7. On September 15, 2017 a re-mastered version of the album was released in digital form.

Track listing

References

1985 albums
La Mafia albums
Spanish-language albums